Below is a list of awards and nominations received by Bahram Beyzai (1938).

Film awards

Other awards
 International Board on Books for Young People diploma (1974)
 D.Litt. honoris causa from the University of St Andrews (2017)

Notes

References 

Ghookasian, Zaven (editor). مجموعهٔ مقالات در نقد و معرفی آثار بهرام بیضایی. Tehran: Agah. 1992.

External links
 Cinema awards and nominations for Bahram Beyzai at IMDb

Bahram Beyzai
Beyzai
Beyzai